or  is a lake in Norway that lies in Namsskogan municipality in Trøndelag county and Bindal municipality in Nordland county.

See also
 List of lakes in Norway
 Geography of Norway

References

Lakes of Trøndelag
Lakes of Nordland
Namsskogan
Bindal